Ngaire Margaret Kerse  is a New Zealand medical academic, and as of 2019 is a full professor at the University of Auckland.

Academic career
After a 1998 PhD titled  'Health promotion and older people : a general practice intervention study'  at the University of Melbourne, Kerse moved to the University of Auckland, rising to full professor.

In the 2020 New Year Honours, Kerse was appointed a Member of the New Zealand Order of Merit, for services to seniors and health.

Selected works 
 
Cameron, Ian D., Lesley D. Gillespie, M. Clare Robertson, Geoff R. Murray, Keith D. Hill, Robert G. Cumming, and Ngaire Kerse. "Interventions for preventing falls in older people in care facilities and hospitals." Cochrane Database of Systematic Reviews 12 (2012).
 Elley, C. Raina, Ngaire Kerse, Bruce Arroll, and Elizabeth Robinson. "Effectiveness of counselling patients on physical activity in general practice: cluster randomised controlled trial." Bmj 326, no. 7393 (2003): 793.
 Arroll, Bruce, Natalie Khin, and Ngaire Kerse. "Screening for depression in primary care with two verbally asked questions: cross sectional study." Bmj 327, no. 7424 (2003): 1144–1146.
 Patterson, Susan M., Cathal A. Cadogan, Ngaire Kerse, Chris R. Cardwell, Marie C. Bradley, Cristin Ryan, and Carmel Hughes. "Interventions to improve the appropriate use of polypharmacy for older people." Cochrane Database of Systematic Revie

References

Living people
New Zealand women academics
Year of birth missing (living people)
University of Melbourne alumni
Academic staff of the University of Auckland
New Zealand medical researchers
New Zealand geriatricians
Women geriatricians
New Zealand women writers